Grenville—Dundas was a federal electoral district represented in the House of Commons of Canada from 1925 to 1968. It was located in the province of Ontario. This riding was created in 1925 from parts of Dundas and Grenville ridings.

It consisted of the counties of Grenville and Dundas.

The electoral district was abolished in 1966 when it was redistributed between Grenville—Carleton and Stormont—Dundas ridings.

Members of Parliament

This riding elected the following members of the House of Commons of Canada:

Election results

|}

|}

|}

|}

|}

|}

|}

|}

|}

|}

On Mr. Casselman's death, 11 May 1958:

|}

|}

|}

|}

See also 

 List of Canadian federal electoral districts
 Past Canadian electoral districts

External links 
Riding history from the Library of Parliament

Former federal electoral districts of Ontario